Dataprobe is an American manufacturer of systems for minimizing downtime to critical data and communication networks. Dataprobe power control products allow remote management of AC and DC power for reboot, energy management and security.   Redundancy switching systems provide T-1 and physical layer switchover and failover for equipment and circuit redundancy.  Remote relay control integrates legacy systems that relay on contact closures into the network environment.  Products are sold to end users, resellers and OEMs.

In 2006, Dataprobe was selected by Harris Corporation to provide voice circuit redundancy switching for the FAA Telecommunications Infrastructure (FTI) project.

Products 
Remote Power Control 
Redundancy Switching    
Remote Relay Control

References

External links
 Official website

Computer peripherals
Networking hardware
Out-of-band management
Companies based in Bergen County, New Jersey
Computer companies established in 1969
Privately held companies based in New Jersey